Christopher Lee (born August 14, 2001) is a Canadian soccer player who plays as a defender.

Early life 
Lee was born in North Vancouver, British Columbia before moving to West Vancouver, British Columbia when he was three, where he began playing youth soccer for West Vancouver SC when he was seven. He later joined Mountain United SC and then joined the Vancouver Whitecaps FC Academy in August 2015.

College career
In 2020, Lee decided to attend the University of British Columbia and join their men's soccer team, although his debut season was cancelled due to the COVID-19 pandemic.

Club career
In the 2021 CPL-U Sports Draft, he was selected fifth overall by Pacific FC of the Canadian Premier League. In June 2021, he signed a developmental contract with Pacific for the 2021 season, allowing him to retain his university eligibility. He made his debut on June 26 against the HFX Wanderers. In August 2020, Pacific coach Pa-Modou Kah confirmed that Lee was returning to the University of British Columbia in the fall, and that the team was interested in having him return to the club for the 2022 season.

In March 2022, he signed for Whitecaps FC 2, ahead of the revived club's inaugural season in MLS Next Pro. In July 2022, he joined the first team on two short-term loans for their matches against Minnesota United FC and FC Cincinnati. After the season, Whitecaps 2 declined his club option for 2023.

International career
In 2016, he attended a camp for the Canada U15 national team.

Career statistics

Club

References

External links

2001 births
Living people
Association football defenders
Canadian soccer players
Soccer people from British Columbia
Pacific FC draft picks
Pacific FC players
Canadian Premier League players
Sportspeople from North Vancouver
Whitecaps FC 2 players
MLS Next Pro players
Vancouver Whitecaps Residency players
Vancouver Whitecaps FC players
UBC Thunderbirds soccer players